Phytoene desaturase (neurosporene-forming) (3-step phytoene desaturase, three-step phytoene desaturase, phytoene desaturase (ambiguous), CrtI (ambiguous)) is an enzyme with systematic name 15-cis-phytoene:acceptor oxidoreductase (neurosporene-forming). This enzyme catalyses the following chemical reaction

 15-cis-phytoene + 3 acceptor  all-trans-neurosporene + 3 reduced acceptor (overall reaction)
 (1a) 15-cis-phytoene + acceptor  all-trans-phytofluene + reduced acceptor
 (1b) all-trans-phytofluene + acceptor  all-trans-zeta-carotene + reduced acceptor
 (1c) all-trans-zeta-carotene + acceptor  all-trans-neurosporene + reduced acceptor

This enzyme is involved in carotenoid biosynthesis.

See also 
 Phytoene desaturase (lycopene-forming)
 15-Cis-phytoene desaturase
 Phytoene desaturase (zeta-carotene-forming)
 Phytoene desaturase (3,4-didehydrolycopene-forming)

References

External links 
 

EC 1.3.99